Glma may refer to:

 Glma, one of the Enochian angels
 GLMA: Health Professionals Advancing LGBTQ Equality
 Great Lakes Mink Association, now part of American Legend Cooperative, marketers of Blackglama
 Exo-1,4-beta-D-glucosaminidase, an enzyme